The Epirus Football Clubs Association (EPFCA) (Ένωση Ποδοσφαιρικών Σωματείων Ηπείρου, ΕΠΣΗΠ = Enosi Podosfairikon Somateion Ipirou, EPSIP) is a football (soccer) organization in the Epirus region that is part of the Greek Football Federation.

It was founded in 1952 and its main headquarters are in the city of Ioannina.

Organization 
The association is a member of the Hellenic Football Federation and organizes a regional football league and cup.

List of Champions

References

External links
 Official website 

Epirus (region)
Association football governing bodies in Greece